Sundarpur is a village in Tangi Block of Khordha district, Orissa, India.

 Population: More than 15000, Voter list 2012 = 9,847.
 Occupation: Most of the people depend upon farming, rice production and vegetable production, according to the season
 Temples: Baba Mukteswar Temple, Maa Budhi Tara Temple, Balunkeswar Temple, Maa sutakhai Temple, maa mangala temple tulasipurpatana, hanuman temple.

 Railway Station: Mukteswar Puri P.H. sundarpur
 Nearest National Highway :  NH 5 at Tangi
 Nearest Hospital : Tangi Govt Hospital
 Nearest Village: Sundarpur, Bhajagarh, Mangala Jodi, Udaya Giri, Sundarpur Colony, Kathuliagoth colony
 Market : Chandapur and Tangi two big markets on NH 5
 Lake: Chilika Lake sundarpur birds park  odisha wildlife

 Ponds: Jagadala Pokhari, udaygiri pokhari near hanuman temple, Badhi Pokhari, Jhara Pokhari

Education:
 Sundarpur U.P School
 Nuapada U.P. School
 Mukteswar Dev M.E. School
 Saraswati Sisu Mandir
 Padma Kumud Bidya Niketan (High School), Sundarpur

Sundarpur Gram Panchayat. It has 22 Wards from (Udayagiri-3, Sundarpur-4, Sundarpur Colony-3, Mangalajori-9, Bhajagarh-3)
Current Sarapanch: Mamata Pradhan (udaygiri) from 17 February 2017 onwards.
Mr Gajendra (President) Sundar Pur Village.

References

Villages in Khordha district